The 2018 Copa do Brasil final stages were the final stages (round of 16, quarter-finals, semi-finals and finals) of the 2018 Copa do Brasil football competition. They were played from 25 April to 17 October 2018. A total of 16 teams competed in the final stages to decide the champions of the 2018 Copa do Brasil.

Format
In the final stages, each tie was played on a home-and-away two-legged basis. If tied on aggregate, the away goals rule would not be used, extra time would not be played and the penalty shoot-out would be used to determine the winner.

Bracket

Round of 16

Draw
The draw for the round of 16 was held on 20 April 2018, 11:00 at CBF headquarters in Rio de Janeiro. The 16 qualified teams were divided in two pots. Teams from Pot 1 were the ones which competed at the 2018 Copa Libertadores. Pot 2 was composed of the five teams which qualified through the Fourth Stage plus the champions of 2017 Copa Verde, 2017 Copa do Nordeste and 2017 Campeonato Brasileiro Série B.

CBF ranking shown in brackets.

Matches

The first legs were played from 25 April to 16 May and the second legs were played from 9 May to 16 July 2018.

|}
All times are Brasília time, BRT (UTC−3)

Match 76

Tied 0–0 on aggregate, Chapecoense won on penalties and advanced to the quarter-finals.

Match 77

Cruzeiro won 3–2 on aggregate and advanced to the quarter-finals.

Match 78

Bahia won 3–2 on aggregate and advanced to the quarter-finals.

Match 79

Grêmio won 5–1 on aggregate and advanced to the quarter-finals.

Match 80

Corinthians won 3–1 on aggregate and advanced to the quarter-finals.

Match 81

Palmeiras won 3–2 on aggregate and advanced to the quarter-finals.

Match 82

Flamengo won 1–0 on aggregate and advanced to the quarter-finals.

Match 83

Santos won 6–3 on aggregate and advanced to the quarter-finals.

Quarter-finals

Draw
The draw for the quarter-finals was held on 30 May 2018, 11:00 at CBF headquarters in Rio de Janeiro. All teams were placed into a single pot.

CBF ranking shown in brackets.

Matches

The first legs were played on 1 and 2 August and the second legs were played on 15 and 16 August 2018.

|}
All times are Brasília time, BRT (UTC−3)

Match 84

Corinthians won 2–0 on aggregate and advanced to the semi-finals.

Match 85

Flamengo won 2–1 on aggregate and advanced to the semi-finals.

Match 86

Palmeiras won 1–0 on aggregate and advanced to the semi-finals.

Match 87

Tied 2–2 on aggregate, Cruzeiro won on penalties and advanced to the semi-finals.

Semi-finals

Draw
The draw to determine the home-and-away teams for both legs was held on 22 August 2018, 11:00 at CBF headquarters in Rio de Janeiro.

Matches

The first legs were played on 12 September and the second legs were played on 26 September 2018.

|}
All times are Brasília time, BRT (UTC−3)

Match 88

Corinthians won 2–1 on aggregate and advanced to the finals.

Match 89

Cruzeiro won 2–1 on aggregate and advanced to the finals.

Finals

Draw
The draw to determine the home-and-away teams for both legs was held on 27 September 2018, 14:30 at CBF headquarters in Rio de Janeiro.

Matches
The first leg was played on 10 October and the second leg was played on 17 October 2018.

|}
All times are Brasília time, BRT (UTC−3)

Match 90

References

2018 Copa do Brasil